Junonia genoveva, the mangrove buckeye, is a butterfly of the family Nymphalidae. The species was first described by Pieter Cramer in 1780. It is found in South America, and possibly into Central America.

The wingspan is 45–57 mm.

The butterfly is easily confused with Junonia evarete, the tropical buckeye, also found in South America. Not only have the common names mangrove and tropical buckeye been confused, but the two species of butterflies themselves have been sometimes misidentified in past literature. Recent consensus designated Junonia genoveva the mangrove buckeye and Junonia evarete the tropical buckeye. Recent research and reclassification has determined that these species occur in South America.

The species Junonia neildi, the West Indian mangrove buckeye, was formerly a subspecies of Junonia genoveva. It is found in Florida, south Texas, Mexico, and the Caribbean. Its split from Junonia genoveva left Junonia genoveva as a South American species. The only members of the genus Junonia currently found in Florida are Junonia neildi, Junonia coenia, and Junonia zonalis.

With recent reclassification of some Junonia species, the mangrove buckeye Junonia genoveva is confined primarily to South America, and is not found in North America or the Caribbean. The West Indian mangrove buckeye, Junonia neildi, is found in the West Indies, Florida, south Texas, and Mexico (as mentioned above). The Pacific mangrove buckeye, Junonia pacoma is found on the Pacific coast of Mexico. The South American mangrove buckeye, Junonia litoralis, is found along the coast of tropical South America and possibly into Central America.

The larvae have been recorded on Stachytarpheta, Ruellia tuberosa and Blechum in Jamaica. Adults feed on flower nectar.

Subspecies
Junonia genoveva genoveva (Suriname)
Junonia genoveva constricta (Venezuela, Colombia)
Junonia genoveva hilaris (Paraguay, Uruguay)
Junonia genoveva incarnata (Colombia, Venezuela)
Junonia genoveva infuscata (Ecuador)
Junonia genoveva michaelisi (Central America, Honduras, Florida (US), Bahamas, Antilles, Puerto Rico)
Junonia genoveva vivida (Guyana, Suriname)

References

External links

 Noctuidae of North America

genoveva
Butterflies of North America
Butterflies of Central America
Butterflies of the Caribbean
Nymphalidae of South America
Mangrove fauna
Butterflies of Cuba
Butterflies of Jamaica
Lepidoptera of Brazil